Somankidi or Somankidy is a small town and urban commune in the Cercle of Kayes in the Kayes Region of south-western Mali. The town lies on the north bank of the Senegal River, 22 km northwest of Kayes. In 2009 the commune had a population of 6,622.

References

External links
.
New York Times article

Communes of Kayes Region